San Potito may refer to:

People

Saint Potitus, a Bulgarian Catholic saint

Places (Italy)
San Potito Sannitico, a municipality in the Province of Caserta 
San Potito Ultra, a municipality in the Province of Avellino
San Potito (Campotosto), a civil parish of Campotosto, in the province of L'Aquila 
San Potito (Lugo), a civil parish of Lugo, in the province of Ravenna